The Apartment: Rising Stars Edition is the fifth season of reality show competition The Apartment which after six seasons is the longest running reality competition television show in Asia.  The contestants are 12 up-and-coming interior designers competing to win $100,000. Its judges are Laurence Llewelyn-Bowen, Jamie Durie (who also hosts), and Genevieve Gorder.

Contestants

Judges
 Genevieve Gorder
 Jamie Durie
 Laurence Llewelyn-Bowen

Episodes

Teams

Elimination 

 Green background and WINNER means the contestant won The Apartment - Rising Stars Edition.
 Silver background and RUNNER-UP means the contestant was the runner-up on The Apartment - Rising Stars Edition.
 Blue background and WIN means the contestant won that challenge.
 Pink background and BTM 3 mean the contestant worst challenge but safe.
 Orange background and BTM 2 mean the contestant worst challenge but safe.
 Dark Yellow background and WDR mean contestant withdrew due to fight of a team.
 Red background and ELIM means the contestant lost and was eliminated of the competition.

In episode 3, Ally & Cara land down bottom 2, but no one home.

In episode 4, Andres & Ben land down bottom 2, but no one home, Cara eliminated because struggle.

In episode 5, Aleksandra, Beck, Naya land down bottom 3, and result is Naya eliminated.

In episode 7, Beck & Ernest land down bottom 2, and the shocking is coming, both are eliminated.

References

2017 Malaysian television seasons
Celebrity reality television series
Home renovation television series
Television shows filmed in Malaysia